Gianfrancesco I Gonzaga (1395 – 23 September 1444) was Marquess of Mantua from 1407 to 1444. He was also a condottiero.

Biography
Gianfrancesco was the son of Francesco I Gonzaga and Margherita Malatesta.  He inherited the rule of Mantua in 1407, when he was 12. In his first years, he was under the patronage of his uncle Carlo Malatesta and, indirectly, of the Republic of Venice. In 1409 he married Paola Malatesta, daughter of Malatesta IV Malatesta of Pesaro, by whom he had two sons, Ludovico, who succeeded him as Marquess of Mantua, and Carlo. He was the first Gonzaga to bear the title of marquess, which he obtained from Emperor Sigismund on 22 September 1433.

He fought for the Papal States and the Malatestas in 1412 and 1417, respectively, and was capitano generale (commander-in-chief) of the Venetian Armies from 1434. Later he left the alliance with Venice and entered at the service of the Visconti of Milan, starting an unsuccessful war against Venice which caused the loss of several Mantuan territories.

During his reign the famous humanist Vittorino da Feltre was invited to Mantua, as well as numerous artists like Pisanello and others, starting the traditional role of the city as a capital of Italian Renaissance. He founded the first workshop in Italy for the manufacture of tapestries. Cecilia Gonzaga, his daughter, was a humanist and scholar who received instruction from Vittorino. He pushed for his daughter to marry Oddantonio da Montefeltro, the first duke of Urbino, but renounced the arrangement later when the Duke turned out to be a cruel ruler.

References

See also
Wars in Lombardy

1395 births
1444 deaths
Francesco 1
15th-century condottieri
Francesco 1
Republic of Venice generals
Burials in the Cappella Gonzaga, San Francesco, Mantua